William de Shepesheved (–) was an English chronicler and Cistercian monk.

Life 

William de Shepesheved presumably took his name from Shepshed in Leicestershire. He was a monk of the Cistercian house of Crokesden, Staffordshire. He wrote a list of the names of the monks of the house and chronicles of English history from 1066 down to 1320. These are extant in manuscript.

See also 

 Croxden Abbey

References

Sources 

 

Attribution:

Further reading 

 Greenslade, M. W.; Pugh, R. B., eds. (1970). "9. The Abbey of Croxden". A History of the County of Stafford. Vol. 3. London: A. Constable. p. 230.
 Lynam, Charles (1911). The Abbey of St. Mary, Croxden, Staffordshire. A Monograph. London: Sprague & Co.
 Morgan, Philip (2016). "Historical Writing in the North-West Midlands and the Chester Annals of 1385–88". In Bothwell, James; Dodd, Gwilym (eds.). Fourteenth Century England IX. Boydell & Brewer. Cambridge University Press. pp. 109–129. .

13th-century births
14th-century deaths
14th-century English Roman Catholic priests
14th-century English writers
English Cistercians